The Province of Victoria is an ecclesiastical province of the Anglican Church of Australia. It consists of the State of Victoria and some New South Wales parishes in the Diocese of Wangaratta. The province consists of five dioceses: Ballarat, Bendigo, Gippsland, Melbourne and Wangaratta. 

The metropolitan of the province is the Archbishop of Melbourne, currently (2018) Philip Freier.

External links
 Website links of many Anglican parishes in Victoria

 
Victoria
Protestantism in Victoria (Australia)